Hirnoda is a village in Phulera tehsil of the Jaipur district in Rajasthan state of India.

Demography
As per 2011 census, Hirnoda has total 1107 families residing. Village has population of 6,229  of which 3,186 were males while 3,043 were females.
Average Sex Ratio of Hirnoda village is 955 which is higher than Rajasthan state average of 928.
Literacy rate of Hirnoda village was 73.56% which is higher than 66.11% of Rajasthan. Male literacy rate was 86.14% while female literacy rate was 60.28%.
Schedule Caste (SC) constitutes 10.1% while Schedule Tribe (ST) were 1.5% of total population.

References

Villages in Jaipur district